Jakhal railway station is located in Fatehabad district in the Indian state of Haryana and serves Jakhal Mandi.

Railway station
Jakhal railway station is operated by Northern Railway zone and lies under Delhi railway division.The railway station consists of 3 platforms. A total of 98 trains halt at Jakhal railway station.

History
The Southern Punjab Railway Co. opened the Delhi–Bhatinda–Samasatta line in 1897. The line passed through Muktasar and Fazilka tehsils and provided direct connection through Samma Satta (now in Pakistan) to Karachi.

The Ludhiana–Jakhal line was laid in 1901, possibly by the Southern Punjab Railway Co.

Jakhal–Hisar line, on to Hisar–Sadalpur line, passes through here.

Electrification
The electrification of the Rohtak–Bathinda–Lehra Muhabat sector was completed in 2018–19.

Electrification of the Hisar–Jakhal–Ludhiana line was initiated in 2016. In which Hisar–Jakhal section was completed in 2018 and rest is in progressing expected to be completed in 2019.

Tracks
Delhi–Jakhal–Bhatinda is double electric line.

References

External links
Trains at Jakhal

Railway stations in Fatehabad district
Delhi railway division
Railway stations in India opened in 1897
Railway junction stations in Haryana